The Monster anime series adapts Naoki Urasawa's manga of the same name. The 74-episode series was created by Madhouse and broadcast on Nippon Television from April 7, 2004, to September 28, 2005. Directed by Masayuki Kojima, it is a faithful adaptation of the entire story; essentially recreated shot for shot and scene for scene compared to the original manga. The few subtle differences include short snippets of additional dialogue and slight re-ordering of scenes in places. The series soundtrack is composed by Kuniaki Haishima.


Episode list

Soundtrack
Opening theme (Episode 1–74): "Grain" by Kuniaki Haishima
Ending theme (Episode 1–32): "For the Love of Life" by David Sylvian.
Ending theme (Episode 33–74): "Make it Home" by Fujiko Hemming.

Notes

References
General

Specific

External links
  
 Official VAP Monster website 
 

Monster